Vrh nad Krašnjo is a small settlement on a hill above Krašnja in the Municipality of Lukovica in the eastern part of the Upper Carniola region of Slovenia.

Name
The name of the settlement was changed from Vrh to Vrh nad Krašnjo in 1955.

References

External links

Vrh nad Krašnjo on Geopedia

Populated places in the Municipality of Lukovica